Operación Soberanía (Operation Sovereignty) was a planned Argentine military invasion of Chile due to the Beagle conflict. The invasion was initiated on 22 December 1978 but was halted after a few hours and Argentine forces retreated from the conflict zone without a fight. Whether the Argentine infantry actually crossed the border into Chile has not been established. Argentine sources insist that they crossed the border.

In 1971 Chile and Argentina agreed to binding arbitration by an international tribunal, under the auspices of the British Government, to settle a boundary dispute.  On 22 May 1977 the British Government announced the decision, which awarded the Picton, Nueva and Lennox islands to Chile.

On 25 January 1978 Argentina rejected the decision and attempted to militarily coerce Chile into negotiating a division of the islands that would produce a boundary consistent with Argentine claims.

Date, objective and name of the operation
According to Argentine sources, after the Argentine repudiation of the arbitration award in January 1978, the invasion plans were given different names depending on the planning level and phase. Also, the targets of the invasion changed according to the political situation and to the information about the Chilean defense effort: first only the Picton, Nueva and Lennox islands, then the "little" Evout, Hoorn, Deceit and Barnevelt islands, then both groups of islands. Finally, on Friday 15 December 1978 Argentina's President Jorge Videla signed the order to invade on 21 December 1978 at 04:30 as the beginning of the invasion, but it was postponed to the next day because of the bad weather conditions in the landing zone.

Military imbalance 
At the time of the crisis, the Argentine military was substantially larger than that of Chile; in addition, the Chilean regime was more politically isolated and had suffered deteriorating relations with its main suppliers of arms. The Chilean military, however, had the advantage of defending difficult terrain, as well as being a more professional force, while decades of intervention by the Argentine armed forces in day-to-day politics had degraded their professional skills.

There was considerable international condemnation of the Chilean regime's human rights record, with the United States expressing particular concern after Orlando Letelier's 1976 assassination in Washington D.C. The United States banned the export of weapons to Chile through the Kennedy Amendment, later International Security Assistance and Arms Export Control Act of 1976. 16 Northrop F-5's were delivered to Chile before the embargo took effect, but they arrived without any armament.  In 1980 Chile was excluded from UNITAS joint naval maneuvers because of human rights violations. Germany, Austria and the United Kingdom the traditional supplier of the Chilean Armed Forces, did not supply weapons to Chile.

In 1978, the United States extended the Kennedy amendment to Argentina as well because of its human rights record, which led to the Armed Forces purchases shifting to Europe: France, Germany, and  Austria exported weapons to Argentina even during the critical phase of the Beagle conflict, as Argentina had already rejected the international binding Arbitral Award. In December 1978, when the outbreak of war appeared unavoidable, the German shipbuilding and engineering works Blohm + Voss and the Argentine Junta agreed to the building of four destroyers. In November 1978 France delivered two corvettes to Argentina, originally built for the apartheid Regime in South Africa. United States President Ronald Reagan (1981–1989) would later improve relations to Argentina due to their military support for Nicaragua's Contras. (See Operation Charly).

The United Kingdom delivered Type 42 destroyers to the Argentine junta. On 19 September 1977  (built and completed in the UK) sailed to Argentina from the Vickers Shipbuilding yard in Barrow-in-Furness; on 28 November 1981  (built in Argentina, completed in the UK) sailed from Portsmouth.

An overview of both countries' defense spending:

* Costs in millions of 1979 US dollars.

The Argentines' numerical advantage was counterbalanced by the following factors:
 Defense is less risky than attack
 Chile spent a higher portion of its gross domestic product on defense
 The politicization of the Argentine armed forces diminished their military readiness
 The Andes mountain range is a difficult natural barrier and the geography of the Tierra del Fuego provided advantages to Chilean naval forces in the immediate operational theatre

The Ambassador of the United States in Argentina (1978) Raúl Castro described the attitude of the Argentine military towards a possible war with the following:

Argentine plan 
No Argentine official documents or statements concerning the planning of the war of aggression against Chile have been released. But so many individual accounts exist among the Argentine ranks that the existence of a plan has not been disputed.

The Argentine Government planned to first occupy the islands around Cape Horn and then, in a second phase, either to stop or continue hostilities according to the Chilean reaction. Argentina had already drafted a declaration of war. An Argentine complaint in the UN Security Council over Chile's military occupation of the disputed islands was to precede the attack.

Rubén Madrid Murúa in "La Estrategia Nacional y Militar que planificó Argentina, en el marco de una estrategia total, para enfrentar el conflicto con Chile el año 1978", ("Memorial del Ejército de Chile", Edición Nº 471, Santiago, Chile, 2003, S. 54-55), stated that the Argentine General Staff planned the operation under the name "Planeamiento Conjunto de Operaciones Previstas contra Chile".

The Argentines planned amphibious landings to seize the islands southwards of the Beagle Channel, along with massive land-based attacks:

 at 20:00 on 22 December 1978 a task force of the Argentine Navy and the Argentine Marines ( Batallón N° 5 ) under the command of Humberto José Barbuzzi would seize the islands Horn, Freycinet, Hershell, Deceit and Wollaston.
 at 22:00 on 22 December 1978 the Argentine task force (with Naval Infantry Battalions N° 3 and N° 4) would seize Picton, Nueva and Lennox islands and secure for the navy the east mouth of the Beagle Channel.
 at 24:00 on 22 December 1978 the invasion of continental Chile would begin. The Fifth Army Corps under command of José Antonio Vaquero would seize Punta Arenas and Puerto Natales, the largest two cities of the Chilean Magallanes Region.
 at daylight 23 December 1978 the Argentine Air Force would begin attacks against Chilean Air Force.
 Later, Third Army Corps under the command of Luciano Benjamín Menéndez would start an offensive through the Andean passes of "Libertadores", "Maipo" and "Puyehue" (today Cardenal Samore Pass) to seize Santiago, Valparaíso and the Los Lagos Region.

The Second Army Corps under the command of Leopoldo Galtieri would protect the north of Argentina from a potential Brazilian attack and its II Brigada de Caballería blindada would protect the Argentine region of Río Mayo in Chubut Province from a possible Chilean attack.

The Argentine Armed Forces expected between 30,000 and 50,000 dead in the course of the war.

Argentina solicited a Peruvian attack in Chile's north, but Peru rejected this demand and ordered only a partial mobilization.

Plan for the time after the invasion 
For the postwar phase of the operation, the Argentine Navy prepared  political instructions to be followed in the southern zone after the disputed islands were under Argentinian sovereignty. They defined the new border, navigation rights for Chilean ships, instructions in case of confrontations with the Chilean Navy, dealing with injured personnel, prisoners of war, etc.

Chilean preparedness 

There was no surprise factor, since the Chilean military kept movements of the Argentine fleet under surveillance and monitored the build-up of Argentine troops. Chilean troops were deployed along the border, ready to meet any invaders.

Chile planted mines in certain areas along its borders with Argentina, Bolivia and Peru. and dynamited some mountain passes.

Parts of route 9-CH between Punta Arenas and Puerto Natales were selected to serve as extra airstrips in the case of an invasion. A defensive position was built up the narrowest part of Brunswick Peninsula to avoid or delay an Argentine capture of Punta Arenas.  In contrast to the defensive war planned by the Chilean Army in Punta Arenas and Puerto Natales, the Chilean army had plans for an attack to invade the Argentine part of Tierra del Fuego, but the control of the island of Tierra del Fuego was considered a secondary goal since its control was believed to depend on the outcome of the clash of the navies.

The combat-ready Chilean fleet sailed on 22 December 1978 from the fjords of Hoste Island to frustrate an Argentine landing. Rear Admiral Raúl López, Chief of the Chilean fleet, kept silent as to whether he would simply wait or initiate an attack on the enemy navy.

Chilean biochemist Eugenio Berríos is reported to have worked on a plan to poison the water supply of Buenos Aires in the event of war.

Operation aborted 
On D-day, a severe storm impeded Argentine operations in the disputed area. Meanwhile, Pope John Paul II, alarmed by the situation, decided to act personally and informed both governments that he was sending his personal envoy, Cardinal Antonio Samoré, to both capitals. Six hours before landing, the Argentine fleet turned back and Operation Soberanía was called off.

Whether the Argentine infantry actually crossed the border into Chile or only waited at the border for the result of the naval combat cannot be established. Argentine sources insist that they crossed the border which would be inconsistent with the two-phase war plan.

Alejandro Luis Corbacho, in "Predicting the probability of war during brinkmanship crisis: The Beagle and the Malvinas conflicts"  considers the reasons for cancelling the operation (p. 45):

On p. 46:

Analysis 

Unlike the prelude to the 1982 invasion of the Falkland Islands, from the beginning of Operation Soberanía there were no critical misconceptions on Argentina's side about Chile's commitment to defend its territory: the entire Chilean Navy was in the disputed area, an unequivocal fact at Cape Horn. As stated by David R. Mares in "Violent Peace: Militarized Interstate Bargaining in Latin America":

Although it had called off the operation, the Argentine government never gave up on the use of military force to pressure Chile. After the invasion of the Falklands on 2 April 1982, the Argentine junta planned the military occupation of the disputed islands in the Beagle channel, as stated by Brigadier Basilio Lami Dozo, chief of the Argentine Air Force during the Falklands war, in an interview with the Argentine magazine Perfil:

Augusto Pinochet foresaw a long and bloody war, a kind of partisan war:

Argentine Falklands War veteran Martín Balza, Chief of Staff of the Argentine Army (1991–1999), caused a stir in 2003 when he declared his conviction that in 1978, Chile would have won the war had it broken out.

See also 
 Falklands War

References

Bibliography 
 "Beagle Channel Arbitration between the Republic of Argentina and the Republic of Chile." Report and Decision of the Court of Arbitration via legal.un.org.
 Cisneros, Andrés  and Carlos Escudé. "Las relaciones con Chile." Historia general de las Relaciones Exteriores de la República Argentina . Buenos Aires: Cema.
 Corbacho, Alejandro Luis. Predicting the Probability of War During Brinkmanship Crises: The Beagle and the Malvinas Conflicts. (Spanish Language) Universidad del CEMA, Argentina,  Documento de Trabajo No. 244, September 2003.
 Escudé, Carlos and Andrés Cisneros. Historia general de las relaciones exteriores de la República Argentina. 
 Gugliamelli, Juan E., Divisionsgeneral (a.D.). Cuestión del Beagle. Negociación directa o diálogo de armas (Trans.:The Beagle-Question, direct Negotiations or Dialog of the Weapons), in Spanish Language. (Book compiled from articles of Argentine Magazin "Estrategia", Buenos Aires Nr:49/50, enero-febrero 1978, published.
 Haffa, Annegret I. Beagle-Konflikt und Falkland (Malwinen)-Krieg. Zur Außenpolitik der Argentinischen Militarregierung 1976-1983 (in German). München/Köln/London: Weltforum Verlag, 1987. .
 Hernekamp, Karl. Der argentinisch-chilenisch Grenzstreit am Beagle-Kanal (in German). Hamburg: Institut für Iberoamerika-Kunde,  1980.
 Laudy, Mark. The Vatican Mediation of the Beagle Channel Dispute: Crisis Intervention and Forum Building in Words Over War of Carnegie Commission on Preventing Deadly Conflict.
 Madrid, Alberto Marín. El arbitraje del Beagle y la actitud Argentina. 1984, Editorial Moisés Garrido Urrea, id = A-1374-84 XIII, 
 Madrid Murúa, Rubén. "La Estrategia Nacional y Militar que planificó Argentina, en el marco de una estrategia total, para enfrentar el conflicto con Chile el año 1978", Memorial del Ejército de Chile, Edición Nº 471, Santiago, Chile, 2003, Spanish Language
 Martín, Antonio Balza General and Mariano Grondona: Dejo Constancia: memorias de un general argentino. Editorial Planeta, Buenos Aires 2001, Spanish Language
 Ministerio de Relaciones Exteriores de Chile. Relaciones Chileno-Argentinas, La controversia del Beagle. Genf 1979, English and Spanish Language
 Oellers-Frahm, Karin. Der Schiedsspruch in der Beagle-Kanal-Streitigkeit, Berichte und Urkunden: Max-Planck-Institut für ausländisches öffentliches Recht und Völkerrecht, German Language
 Olivos, Sergio Gutiérrez. Comentarios sobre el tratado de paz y amistad con Argentina. Academia Chilena de Ciencias Sociales, 1985, in Spanish language
 Rojas, Isaac F. La Argentina en el Beagle y Atlántico sur 1. Parte. Editorial Diagraf, Buenos Aires, Argentina, Spanish Language
 Rojas, Isaac F. and Arturo Medrano: Argentina en el Atlántico, Chile en el Pacífico. Editorial Nemont, Buenos Aires, Argentina, 1979, .
 Romero, Luis Alberto. Argentina in the twentieth Century. Pennsylvania State University Press, translated by James P. Brennan, 1994, .
 Serrano, Francisco Bulnes and Patricia Arancibia Clavel. La Escuadra En Acción . Chile, Editorial Grijalbo, 2004, .
 Valdivieso, Fabio Vio. La mediación de su S.S. el Papa Juan Pablo II, Editorial Aconcagua, Santiago de Chile, 1984, Spanish Language
 Wagner, Andrea. Der argentinisch-chilenische Konflikt um den Beagle-Kanal. Ein Beitrag zu den Methoden friedlicher Streiterledigung. Verlag Peter Lang, Frankfurt a.M. 1992, German Language

External links 

 Chilean Telecast of Televisión Nacional de Chile "Informe Especial", Theme El año que vivimos en peligro, (sometimes in YouTube), Spanish Language
 Chilean Telecast of Corporación de Televisión de la Pontificia Universidad Católica de Chile "annonimos", Theme: Beagle: La guerra que no fue, (in YouTube) in Spanish Language
 Argentine Telecast of Argentine History Channel: Operativo Soberanía (in YouTube), Spanish Language
 Special edition of El Mercurio, Santiago de Chile, 2 September 2005, Spanish Language. There are Interviews with contemporary witness like Ernesto Videla, Jaime Del Valle, Helmut Brunner, Marcelo Delpech und Luciano Benjamín Menéndez. Spanish Language.
 Interview with the (later, in the nineties) Chief Commander of the Argentine Army Martín Balza in El Mercurio  de Santiago de Chile, 2 September 2005, Spanish Language
 Interview with Sergio Onofre Jarpa, Chile's Ambassador in Argentina 1978 to 1982 in  La Tercera, Santiago, Chile, 17 March 2002,  Spanish Language
 Interview with Argentine General Luciano Benjamín Menéndez, Commandant of the III Army Corps in El Mercurio de Santiago de Chile, (from the Argentine Magazine "Somos"), Spanish Language
 Interview with Pio Laghi, Nuntius in Argentina, 1978, in  Clarín , Buenos Aires, 20 December 1998. Spanish Language
 Interview with the Ambassador of the United States of America in Argentina, Raúl Héctor Castro, in Clarín  Buenos Aires, 20 December 1998, Spanish Language
 Interview with the former Chief of the "Secretaría General del Ejército" (a Think-Tank of the Argentine Army), General Reynaldo Bignone, President of Argentina after the Falkland War, in Clarín , Buenos Aires, 20 December 1998, Spanish Language
 Article Cartas desde el Abismo, Clarín , Buenos Aires, 20 December 1998, Spanish Language
 Article Beagle: historia secreta de la guerra que no fue La Nación, Buenos Aires, 12. August 1996, Spanish Language
 Article Historia de la santa mediación en Clarín , Buenos Aires, 20 December 1998, Spanish Language
 Chile-Argentina Relations, Spanish Language
 Toma de decisiones políticas y la influencia de los discursos oficialistas durante el Connflicto del Beagle: Chile - Argentina 1977-1979, Spanish Language

Beagle conflict
Military history of Chile
National Reorganization Process
Military history of Argentina
Soberania
1978 in Argentina
Argentina–Chile relations
1978 in Chile
December 1978 events in South America